The Latvia women's national under-18 and under-19  is a national basketball team of Latvia and is governed by the Latvia Basketball Association. It represents Latvia in international under-19 and under-18 (under age 19 and under age 18) women's basketball competitions.

See also
 Latvia women's national basketball team
 Latvia women's national under-17 basketball team
 Latvia men's national under-19 basketball team

References

Basketball in Latvia
Basketball teams in Latvia
Women's national under-19 basketball teams
B